The Shiny Shrimps is a 2019 French sports comedy film directed by Cédric Le Gallo and Maxime Govare. The film stars Nicolas Gob as Matthias Le Goff, an Olympic swimming champion who makes a homophobic comment in a television interview, and is disciplined by the national swim team with the responsibility of coaching a gay water polo team who aspire to compete in the Gay Games.

The film premiered at the L'Alpe d'Huez Film Festival on 19 January 2019, and was released theatrically in France on 8 May 2019. A sequel, The Revenge of the Shiny Shrimps, was released on 13 April 2022.

Synopsis
Mathias Le Goff is a world vice-champion swimmer. After making homophobic comments during a television interview, he is sanctioned to train the glittering Shiny Shrimp, a gay water polo team, for three months for their participation in the Gay Games in Croatia. Two worlds that everything seems to oppose will have to team up as best they can.

Cast

Reception
The website's critics consensus reads, "The Shiny Shrimps traffics in cliche, but for fans of inspirational underdog stories, the results may be too uplifting to resist."

The film received much support in public through popular presentations that included local LGBT/queer athletes.

During the COVID-19 pandemic, the film remained a popular suggestion in LGBT+ media listings of video on demand.

References

External links
 

2019 films
2019 comedy films
2019 LGBT-related films
2010s French films
2010s French-language films
2010s sports comedy films
French LGBT-related films
French sports comedy films
Gay-related films
LGBT-related sports comedy films
Water polo films